Julien Sablé (born 11 September 1980) is a French professional football manager and former player who played as a midfielder. He was most recently an assistant coach at Saint-Étienne. In his playing days, he represented France at youth international level.

Career
Sablé was the captain of AS Saint-Étienne, where he made his first team debut in the 1997–98 season. He became an integral member of the club the next season, when they earned promotion into Ligue 1. In 2007, he signed a contract with RC Lens. In January 2009, he joined OGC Nice.

He joined SC Bastia in October 2012, before retiring at the end of the following season, the same day as Mickaël Landreau.

Managerial statistics

References

External links

France U-16 season 1995–96
France U-17 season 1996–97

1980 births
Living people
French footballers
Footballers from Marseille
Association football midfielders
France under-21 international footballers
France youth international footballers
AS Saint-Étienne players
RC Lens players
OGC Nice players
SC Bastia players
Ligue 1 players
Ligue 2 players
Ligue 1 managers
AS Saint-Étienne managers
French football managers